K-5 is a submarine-launched ballistic missile under  development by Defence Research and Development Organisation of India. The missile has a planned range of around 5,000-6,000 kilometres.

Description 
The K-5 is a submarine-launched ballistic missile. The missile consists of three separate stages and uses solid rocket propellant. The missile will be able to carry a payload weighing two tonnes. It is being developed to match the range of the Agni-V missile. It will be equipped on the Arihant-class submarines code named S4.

The K-5 will be equipped with countermeasures to avoid radar detection and will be the fastest missile in its class.

Development 
The K-5 is being developed by the Defence Research and Development Organisation (DRDO). The development of the missile started in 2015. After completing the development of the K-4 (missile) in January 2020, the DRDO shifted its focus towards developing the K-5.

As of December 2018, preparations for the maiden test of the missile were underway. In October 2020, Hindustan Times reported that the missile is currently under development and is expected to be tested by 2022.

See also 

 K Missile family

References 

Submarine-launched ballistic missiles
Defence Research and Development Organisation
Ballistic missiles of India
Nuclear weapons programme of India
Nuclear missiles of India